C68 may refer to :
 Caldwell 68, a reflection/emission nebula
 Caudron C.68, a French biplane
 Douglas C-68, an American transport plane
 Ruy Lopez, Exchange Variation, a chess opening
 Bill C-68, which created the Canadian Firearms Registry